Gary John Christian (born 7 August 1971) is an English professional golfer who has played on the Web.com Tour and the PGA Tour.

Christian was born in Carshalton, England. As a junior, he played golf at Addington Palace Golf Club, England. He played college golf at Auburn University and turned professional in 1997. Christian was a member of the Nationwide Tour in 1999 and has been a member since 2006. He picked up his first win on tour at the 2009 Northeast Pennsylvania Classic, where he defeated Mathias Grönberg in a playoff that went to nine holes, equaling a Nationwide Tour record for longest playoff.

Christian has also played on several mini tours during his career where he has won over 30 events. The tours he has won on are the Dakotas Tour, All-Star Emerald Coast Tour, DP Tour, Teardrop Tour and the Tight Lies Tour.

Christian appeared on the TV show The Weakest Link in 2001. He is named after Gary Player.

At age 40, Christian finally graduated to the PGA Tour after finishing ninth on the Nationwide Tour's money list. Christian had never played in a PGA Tour event until 2012. He played in 28 events in 2012, making 18 cuts and having a best finish of T-10 at the RBC Canadian Open.

After Christian's touring career ended, he became a commentator on The Golf Channel.

Professional wins (32+)

Nationwide Tour wins (2)

Nationwide Tour playoff record (1–0)

Other wins (30+)
2004 Nebraska Open
30+ wins on mini tours

See also
2011 Nationwide Tour graduates

References

External links

English male golfers
Auburn Tigers men's golfers
PGA Tour golfers
Korn Ferry Tour graduates
People from Carshalton
1971 births
Living people